Nord-Ost (means "North-East" in German) is a Russian musical theatre production that was composed by Aleksei Ivaschenko and Georgii Vasilyev, based on the novel The Two Captains by Veniamin Kaverin. It is a fictional story based around the historical events surrounding the discovery of the Severnaya Zemlya archipelago in 1913. The musical was first staged on October 19, 2002 in the Dubrovka theatre, where it played over 400 performances.

The play celebrates the Russian soldiers who fought in World War II.

In the 1990s Georgy Vasiliyev saw Les Misérables in New York City. He felt inspired to take theatre to Russia. He tried to buy the rights to Les Misérables but did not succeed, so he decided to start a homegrown Russian production. He spent funds to convert a former ball-bearing factory "culture hall" into a modern theatre. He spent $4 million U.S. dollars, making the play the most expensive theatre project in the history of Russia. The tickets were 15 U.S. dollars each, making them relatively expensive. Vasiliyev showed his financiers a marketing study stating that 30% of Moscow's population fit the profile audience that would be willing to pay for the production, due to changing sensibilities and increasing incomes. The Russian theatre community had a prejudice against this kind of play. Peter Baker and Susan Glasser said that the Russian theatre community "considered the concept the thespian version of McDonald's."

Vasiliyev said "Nord-Ost was a sort of protest against tarnishing our history, against not believing in your own strength, against all this pervasive, depressing, ugly stuff in mass media. Nord-Ost is the opposite. It's a romantic story about family. It's a story that elevates us and our history. It's a story that enables us to look at our history not as the history of class struggle, wars, and repressions, but a history of people and personal achievements."

On October 23, 2002 Chechen terrorists took the audience hostage in the Moscow theater that was showing the production of Nord-Ost, threatening to blow up the building and demanding withdrawal of Russian troops from Chechnya. Most of the hostages were released after the theatre was stormed by special forces. 130 hostages died from poison gas used by Russian special forces; "Nord-Ost” lost 17 members of the team, including 2 child actors aged 13 (Kristina Kurbatova and Arsenii Kurilenko) and one third of all musicians in the orchestra. The producer Georgii Vasilyev had himself been among the hostages.

After the attack, Nord-Ost returned to the same theater stage in Moscow on February 8, 2003 and continued showing there until May 10, 2003, when the producers took it off the stage, blaming a lack of audience interest on fears caused by the attack.

See also

Moscow theater hostage crisis

References

External links 
 Nord-Ost. Memorial Book of Lost Hostages. Detailed site in Russian & English, winner of 2007 'Golden Site' award.
 Nord-ost official site
 Nord-ost official site 
 More versions about Nord-Ost hostage crisis
 Luzhkov Says 'Nord Ost' Will Return to the Stage - article on The Moscow Times (subscription only)

2001 musicals
Moscow theater hostage crisis
Music in Moscow
Severnaya Zemlya
Arctic in fiction
Russian musicals
Musicals based on novels